Tanque Verde Falls are a series of waterfalls in Tanque Verde Canyon east of Tanque Verde, Arizona and Tucson, Arizona. Tanque Verde Ridge of the Rincon Mountains lies to the south and Agua Caleinte Hill to the north. The falls lie south of Redington Road which connects the Tucson Valley to the southwest  with the San Pedro River valley to the east.

A parking area and hiking trail for the falls is maintained by the Southern Arizona Hiking Club.

References

External links

Coronado_National_Forest
Geography of Tucson, Arizona
Landforms of Pima County, Arizona
Waterfalls of Arizona
Tourist attractions in Pima County, Arizona